is a Japanese Buddhist philosopher, educator, author, and nuclear disarmament advocate. He served as the third president and then honorary president of the Soka Gakkai, the largest of Japan's new religious movements. Ikeda is the founding president of the Soka Gakkai International (SGI), the world's largest Buddhist lay organization, which claims to have approximately 12 million practitioners in 192 countries and territories, more than 1.5 million of whom reside outside of Japan as of 2012.

Ikeda was born in Tokyo, Japan, in 1928, to a family of seaweed farmers. He survived the devastation of World War II as a teenager, which he said left an indelible mark on his life and fueled his quest to solve the fundamental causes of human conflict. At age 19, Ikeda began practicing Nichiren Buddhism and joined a youth group of the Soka Gakkai, which led to his lifelong work developing the global peace movement of SGI and founding dozens of institutions dedicated to fostering peace, culture and education. His accomplishments are honored internationally; in Japan he has been described as a "controversial figure" over several decades through the 1990s in relation to the political party Kōmeitō, which he founded, and has been the subject of libelous accusations in Japanese media.

In the 1960s, Ikeda worked to reopen Japan's national relations with China and also to establish the Soka education network of schools from kindergartens through university levels, while beginning to write what would become his multi-volume historical novel, The Human Revolution, about the Soka Gakkai's development during his mentor Josei Toda's tenure. In 1975, he established the Soka Gakkai International, and throughout the 1970s initiated a series of citizen diplomacy efforts through international educational and cultural exchanges for peace. Since the 1980s, in his annual peace proposals marking the anniversary of the SGI's founding, he has increasingly called for nuclear disarmament. Ikeda's vision for the SGI was described in 2010 by Olivier Urbain, then director of the Toda Peace Institute founded by Ikeda, as a "borderless Buddhist humanism that emphasizes free thinking and personal development based on respect for all life."

By 2015, Ikeda had published more than 50 dialogues with scholars, peace activists and leading world figures. In his role as SGI president, Ikeda has visited 55 nations and spoken on subjects including peace, environmentalism, economics, women's rights, interfaith dialogue and Buddhism and science.

Early life and background
Ikeda was born in Ōta, Tokyo, Japan, on 2 January 1928. Ikeda had four older brothers, two younger brothers, and a younger sister. His parents later adopted two more children, for a total of 10 children. Since the mid-nineteenth century, the Ikeda family had successfully farmed nori, edible seaweed, in Tokyo Bay. By the turn of the twentieth century, the Ikeda family business was the largest producer of nori in Tokyo. The devastation of the 1923 Great Kantō earthquake left the family's enterprise in ruins; by the time Ikeda was born, his family was financially struggling.

In 1937, the Second Sino-Japanese War erupted, and Ikeda's eldest brother, Kiichi, was drafted into military service. Within a few years, Ikeda's three other elder brothers were drafted as well. In 1942, while all of his older brothers were overseas in the South-East Asian theatre of World War II, Ikeda's father, Nenokichi, fell ill and was bedridden for two years. To help to support his family, at the age of 14, Ikeda began working in the Niigata Steelworks munitions factory as part of Japan's wartime youth labor corps.

In May 1945, Ikeda's home was destroyed by fire during an Allied air raid, and his family was forced to move to the Ōmori area of Tokyo. In May 1947, after having received no word from his eldest brother, Kiichi, for several years, the Ikeda family, particularly his mother, was informed by the Japanese government that he had been killed in action in Burma (now Myanmar).

In August 1947, at the age of 19, Ikeda was invited by an old friend to attend a Buddhist discussion meeting. It was there that he met Josei Toda, the second president of Japan's Soka Gakkai Buddhist organization. As a result of this encounter, Ikeda began practicing Nichiren Buddhism and joined the Soka Gakkai. He regarded Toda as his spiritual mentor and became a charter member of the group's youth division, later recounting that Toda influenced him through "the profound compassion that characterized each of his interactions."

Career

Shortly after the end of World War II, in January 1946, Ikeda gained employment with the Shobundo Printing Company in Tokyo. In March 1948, Ikeda graduated from Toyo Trade School and the following month entered the night school extension of Taisei Gakuin (present-day Tokyo Fuji University) where he majored in political science. During this time, he worked as an editor of the children's magazine Shonen Nihon (Boy's Life Japan), which was published by one of Josei Toda's companies. Over the next several years, between 1948 and 1953, Ikeda worked for various Toda-owned enterprises, including the Nihon Shogakkan publishing company, the Tokyo Construction Trust credit association, and the Okura Shoji trading company.

Youth leadership
In 1953, at the age of 25, Ikeda was appointed as one of the Soka Gakkai's youth leaders. The following year, he was appointed as director of the Soka Gakkai's public relations bureau, and later became its chief of staff.

In April 1957, a group of young Soka Gakkai members in Osaka were arrested for allegedly distributing money, cigarettes and candies to support the political campaign of a local electoral candidate (who was also a Soka Gakkai member). Ikeda was later arrested and detained in jail for two weeks, charged with allegedly overseeing these activities. Ikeda's arrest came at a time when Soka Gakkai Buddhist candidates were achieving success at both national and local levels. With the growing influence of this liberal grassroots movement, factions of the conservative political establishment initiated a series of media attacks on the Soka Gakkai, culminating in Ikeda's arrest. After a lengthy court case that lasted until 1962, Ikeda was cleared of all charges. The Soka Gakkai characterized this as a triumph over corrupt tyranny, which galvanized its movement.

Soka Gakkai presidency
In May 1960, two years after Toda's death, Ikeda, then 32 years old, succeeded him as president of the Soka Gakkai. Later that year, Ikeda began to travel overseas to build connections between Soka Gakkai members living abroad and expand the movement globally. This was, in Ikeda's words, "Toda's will for the future." While the Soka Gakkai saw its most dramatic growth in Japan after World War II under Toda's leadership, Ikeda led its international expansion into what became the largest, most diverse international lay Buddhist association in the world.

When he became the third Soka Gakkai president, Ikeda "continued the task begun by Soka Gakkai founder Tsunesaburo Makiguchi of fusing the ideas and principles of educational pragmatism with the elements of Buddhist doctrine." He reformed many of the organization's practices, including the aggressive conversion style known as shakubuku, for which the group had been criticized in Japan. He also worked "to improve the movement's public image." The organization "had provoked public opprobrium because of its aggressive recruitment policies and its strongly developed political base." By the latter half of the 20th century, the Soka Gakkai had "matured into a responsible member of society" under Ikeda's leadership while "its ongoing connection with reformist political activity served to keep it in the public eye"; after 1999, "the media assault on Soka Gakkai subsequently evaporated."

In 1979, Ikeda resigned as president of the Soka Gakkai (in Japan), accepting responsibility for the organization's purported deviation from Nichiren Shōshū priesthood doctrine and the accompanying conflict. Hiroshi Hōjō succeeded Ikeda as Soka Gakkai president, and Ikeda was made honorary president.

Ikeda continues to be revered as the Soka Gakkai's spiritual leader, according to Asian studies associate professor Daniel Métraux in 1999. Métraux in 1994 wrote that "adulation of Ikeda in the Gakkai press gives some non-member readers the impression that the Gakkai is little more than an Ikeda personality cult". Sociologist Maria Immacolata Macioti noted in 2002: "President Ikeda is very much loved – and according to a few authoritative studies, too much loved". This has aroused critics for years. One reason for the excommunication of Soka Gakkai by Nichiren Shōshū in 1991 was, according to the "Nichiren Shoshu" entry in The Princeton Dictionary of Buddhism, "Nichiren Shōshū accusing Sōka Gakkai of forming a personality cult around their leader Ikeda" and "Soka Gakkai accusing the Nichiren Shoshu leader Abe Nikken of trying to dominate both organizations."  Sociologist of religion Peter Beyer in 2006 summarizes an understanding in the context of contemporary global society: "Until the 1990s, Soka Gakkai still was related formally to the monastic organization, Nichiren Shoshu, but conflicts over authority led to their separation (Métraux 1994)."

Based on textual analysis of Ikeda's self-presentations as a disciple of Josei Toda and ethnographic fieldwork on the Soka Gakkai, Clark Chilson wrote in 2014 that "Ikeda is not only a charismatic leader but, more specifically, a transformational one. On the basis of Ikeda's self presentations, Gakkai members come to learn a model of the mentor-disciple relationship that is empowering and thus one that encourages them to enter a mentor-disciple relationship with Ikeda". He concludes that: "although Ikeda as a youth was in many ways ordinary, he achieved greatness as a leader as the result of his discipleship to his mentor [Josei Toda]. This holds the promise for Gakkai members that they too can achieve greatness in the mentor-disciple relationship, which in turn helps them see the self-conception of disciple as one of strength. With the self-conception of a disciple, Gakkai members are more likely to strive to achieve goals articulated by their mentor, Ikeda, that transcend their own self interests, such as the expansion of the Gakkai's membership, and the promotion of culture, education, and world peace."

Soka Gakkai International founding

By the 1970s, Ikeda's leadership had expanded the Soka Gakkai into an international lay Buddhist movement increasingly active in peace, cultural, and educational activities. On 26 January 1975, a world peace conference was held in Guam, where Soka Gakkai representatives from 51 countries created an umbrella organization for the growing network of members around the world. This became the Soka Gakkai International (SGI). Ikeda took a leading role in the global organization's development and became the founding president of the SGI. In his address to the assembly, Ikeda encouraged the representatives to dedicate themselves to altruistic action, stating "Please devote yourselves to planting seeds of peace throughout the world."

Religio-political controversies in Japan
Ikeda as Soka Gakkai president and his predecessors Tsunesaburō Makiguchi and Jōsei Toda "have been deeply political, each in different circumstances and distinct ways, which has no doubt contributed to the many controversies in the Soka Gakkai's history," according to religion professor Richard Seager. Makiguchi and Toda were persecuted for opposing Japan's wartime government. In the history of institutional relations between the religious movement Soka Gakkai and the political party Kōmeitō founded in 1964 by Ikeda as an outgrowth from Soka Gakkai, he has faced "unabated criticism against the alleged violation of the separation of religion and state" and been accused of "far-reaching political ambitions." Associate professor of government George Ehrhardt and co-authors write that "Sōka Gakkai's entrance into the political arena [...] permanently transformed the relationship between religion and politics in Japan by dividing those who opposed the creation of a religious political party from those who accepted it."

According to Asian studies professor Daniel Métraux in 1994, Ikeda is "possibly one of the more controversial figures in Japan's modern history". Ikeda's involvement through the Kōmeitō (also known as CGP) has raised controversies in Japanese politics for several decades. There were some charges claiming that Ikeda controlled the Komeito. In 1969 and 1970, there was a freedom of speech controversy about the intent to prevent the publication of Hirotatsu Fujiwara's polemical book, I denounce Soka Gakkai, that vehemently criticized Ikeda, Soka Gakkai and the Komeito. In his 3 May 1970 speech, addressing, among others, Soka Gakkai members, guests and news media, Ikeda responded to the controversy by: apologizing to the nation "for the trouble...the incident caused," affirming the Soka Gakkai's commitment to free speech and religious freedom, announcing a new policy of formal separation between the Soka Gakkai religious movement and Komeito, calling for both moderation in religious conversion practices and democratizing reforms in the Soka Gakkai, and envisioning a Buddhist-inspired humanism. Some authors contend that, despite the formal separation, there are still "strong links" and that the Komeito has remained to some extent the "political arm" of Soka Gakkai. In 2015, addressing the "party's understudied history," political scientist Steven Reed and his co-authors write that "the image of Kōmeitō as a mere political branch of Sōka Gakkai is clearly mistaken" and that "the separation between party and religious group announced by Ikeda Daisaku in 1970 made a real difference."

In October 1982, Ikeda had to appear in court concerning three cases.  In 1996, Los Angeles Times described Ikeda as "the most powerful man in Japan - and certainly one of the most enigmatic", "condemned and praised as a devil and an angel, [...] a despot and a democrat". In 1999, The Economist reported that Ikeda has been called "the most powerful man in Japanese politics." In his assessment of these criticisms and "the changing role of the Komeito in Japanese politics in the 1990s", Daniel Métraux states that: "While it is difficult to determine his exact role, an examination of his daily itinerary would reveal that he would have very little time personally for political management and that most of the aging leader's time is devoted to religious affairs, traveling, and writing. Ikeda may well have influenced the Komeito in a macrosense, but in a microsense he is clearly not involved. The Komeito and its successes have a life of their own; they are certainly not lifeless puppets ready to react to Ikeda's or to the Soka Gakkai's every whim." Ehrhardt and co-authors attribute perpetuation of negative images of Ikeda, Komeito and the Soka Gakkai, firstly, to weekly magazines and tabloids which "tend to ignore standards of substance and veracity", with reporting that is "often biased" ; secondly, to the publications of "disgruntled former administrators and leaders of the religion or party". According to Morehouse College historian and professor of religion, Reverend Dr. Lawrence Carter, in 2003: "Controversy is an inevitable partner of greatness. No one who challenges the established order is free of it. Gandhi had his detractors, as did Dr. King. Dr. Ikeda is no exception."

East Asian history and studies lecturer Brian Gold, in his comparative study of religious leaders Ikeda in Japan and Cho in South Korea, writes in 2005 that "answering the question of why, if so similar, Ikeda has been so much more a controversial figure in his society than Cho, when in fact Ikeda has probably been a more moderating influence", "tells us more about modern (and post-war) Japan than about Ikeda." Gold writes that Ikeda and Soka Gakkai have received "seemingly endless vilification [...] from much of Japanese society over the last several decades" and that "being overtly opposed to the longest-running political establishment of the post-war era, namely the LDP, has made Ikeda the constant source of attacks from the governing party", with "'smear campaigns' [...] generated by tabloid media with close connections to the LDP."  When "the electoral math clearly pointed toward cooperation" between the LDP and Komeito in the late-1990s, the LDP newspaper Jiyū Shimpō printed an official apology and the LDP's press official Yosano Kaoru "apologized for having gone too far in criticizing Ikeda and declared that the research for the articles had been 'improper' (futekisetsu)."

Legacy
Ikeda and the Soka Gakkai members had been excommunicated by Nichiren Shōshū on 28 November 1991. National University of the Arts doctoral fellow Mariano Gancedo wrote that the break with the clergy marked a greater role for Ikeda as spiritual teacher.  In a scholarly historical comparison to the Protestant Reformation, a key conflict between "priestly and pragmatic forms of religion" has been to "adapt or fail" in response to "great change" in society, and in this area Ikeda is credited with democratic and other structurally modernizing reforms that both appealed favorably within the SGI membership organizations and expanded its institutional programs in the areas of peace, culture and education.

Ikeda's leadership "globalized the Soka Gakkai and harnessed its energy to goals that suited new generations in different cultures" and subsequently developed the SGI into a broad-based grassroots peace movement around the world. Ikeda is credited with having fostered among SGI members an ethos of social responsibility and a strong spirit of global citizenship. According to Levi McLaughlin, Associate Professor of Philosophy and Religious Studies, "Ikeda last appeared in a broadcast to members in May 2010. Thereafter, his apotheosis into unquestioned authority was confirmed by his followers."

Ikeda's thoughts and work on a "Buddhist-based humanism" are situated within a broader tradition of east–west dialogue in search of humanistic ideals. In his biography of historian Arnold J. Toynbee, William McNeill describes the aim of the Toynbee-Ikeda dialogues as a "convergence of East and West," the significance of which would be realized by the "flourishing in the Western world" of the Soka Gakkai organization. Whether a "new religious movement" becomes "a legitimate 'new religion' in the global religious system" is "a question of how both those involved in it and those who observe it from the outside understand that movement," according to sociologist of religion Peter Beyer.

As of 2010, more than 40 research institutes and initiatives affiliated with universities, including Shanghai Sanda University and DePaul University, formally study Ikeda's philosophy. Bilingual-bicultural education specialist Jason Goulah's research into transformative world language learning characterizes Ikeda's Buddhist-inspired refinement of Makiguchi's Soka education philosophy as an approach engendering a "world view of dialogic resistance" that responds to the limitations of a neoliberal world view of education. In their introduction to education and cosmopolitanism in Asia, editors Fazal Rizvi and Suzanne S. Choo cite Goulah's work and write that in Ikeda's Soka educational philosophy, "cosmopolitan ideals emerged in opposition to authoritarian state policies that served to entrench narrow-minded nationalism." In a study of 30 of Ikeda's philosophical dialogues, Augusta University associate professor Nai-Cheng Kuo asserts that "Ikeda's humanism has made profound global impacts on education and human lives."

Philosophy and beliefs
Ikeda's relationship with his mentor, Jōsei Toda, and influence of Tsunesaburō Makiguchi's educational philosophy, shaped his emphasis on dialogue and education as fundamental to building trust between people and peace in society. This world view is informed by his belief that Buddhism essentially offers a spiritual dimension "where faith and human dignity intersect to promote positive change in society." He interprets the Middle Way as a path between idealism and materialism, an orientation that places "public interest, practical policy, morality and ethics at the forefront so that people can find prosperity and happiness...." His emphasis on linking individual agency and empowerment with society's attainment of peace and happiness, most notably made in his multi-volume The New Human Revolution, revolves around and gives expression to the Buddhist view of life's inherent dignity.

Ikeda's use of the term ōbutsu myōgō in his 1964 book Seiji shūkyō (Politics and Religion) has been interpreted to mean "politics by people, with mercy and altruism as a Buddhist philosophy, different from the union of politics and religion (seikyo icchi)." The term is also used by Ikeda in the Komeito's founding statement. In the 1969 edition of Seiji shūkyō , "he declared that obutsu myogo would not be an act of Soka Gakkai imposing its will on the Japanese state to install Nichiren Shoshu Buddhism as the national creed," and that "Soka Gakkai, through Komeito, would instead guide Japan to a new, democratic world order, a 'Buddhist democracy' (buppo minshu shugi) combining the Dharma with the best of the Euro-American philosophical tradition to focus on social welfare and humanistic socialism." Another interpretation of his views at that time was that "Buddhist democracy" could be achieved by a "religious revolution" through kōsen-rufu on the premise of achieving "social prosperity in accordance with individual happiness" for the entire society. In 1970, after Ikeda announced the severing of official ties between the Soka Gakkai and Komeito, the use of "politically charged terms such as obutsu myogo" was eliminated. Since the 1970s, an understanding of the term kōsen-rufu took into account religious tolerance, which was made explicit in 1995 in the SGI Charter and, in the 2000s, interpreted by Ikeda to mean the movement  based on the philosophy and teachings of Nichiren that conveys the principles of individual happiness and peace as accessible to all. He is credited with recasting "the idea of kosen-rufu to mean the broad dissemination of, rather than the conversion of the world to, Nichiren Buddhism."

In a 2008 interview, he said : "The ideal of Mahayana Buddhism is the realization of happiness for oneself and for others. Nowhere is this more completely set out than in the Lotus Sutra, which recognizes the Buddha-nature in all people—women and men, those with formal education and those without. It declares that all people, without regard to their class, origin, personal, cultural, or social background, can attain enlightenment. Our recitation of the title of the Lotus Sutra is a way of renewing our vow to live in accord with this ideal."

Ikeda refers in several writings to the Nine Consciousness as an important conception for self-transformation, identifying the ninth one, "amala-vijñāna", with the Buddha-nature. According to him, the "transformation of the karma of one individual" can lead to the transformation of the entire society and humankind.

Accomplishments
Central to Ikeda's activities, whether they be on an institutional level or as a private citizen, is his belief in "Buddhist principles ... rooted in our shared humanity, ... where faith and human dignity intersect to promote positive change in society." His view of a "Buddhist-based humanism," the fostering of mutual respect and dignity, emphasizes human agency in the engagement of dialogue.

Institutional engagement

Ikeda has founded a number of institutions to promote education in all its forms, cultural exchange and the exchange of ideas on peacebuilding through dialogue. They include: Soka University in Tokyo, Japan, and Soka University of America in Aliso Viejo, California; Soka kindergarten, primary and secondary schools in Japan, Korea, Hong Kong, Malaysia, Brazil and Singapore; the Victor Hugo House of Literature, in the Île-de-France region of France; the International Committee of Artists for Peace in the United States; the Min-On Concert Association in Japan; the Tokyo Fuji Art Museum in Japan; the Institute of Oriental Philosophy in Japan with offices in France, Hong Hong, India, Russia and the United Kingdom; the Toda Peace Institute in Japan and the United States; and the Ikeda Center for Peace, Learning, and Dialogue in the United States.

From 1990, Ikeda partnered with Rabbi Abraham Cooper and the Simon Wiesenthal Center to address anti-Semitic stereotypes in Japan. In a 2001 interview, Rabbi Cooper recalled: "The only partners we found to help us bring our concerns to the Japanese public were people from Soka University under the leadership of Daisaku Ikeda. If you ask me who our best friend in Japan is, who 'gets it,' it is Ikeda. He was actually our first visitor to the Museum of Tolerance." Their friendship led to the joint development of a Japanese-language Holocaust exhibition The Courage to Remember, which was seen by more than two million people in Japan between 1994 and 2007. In 2015, a new version of the exhibit opened in Tokyo focusing on the bravery of Anne Frank and Chiune Sugihara.

Ikeda was an original proponent of the Earth Charter Initiative, co-founded by Mikhail Gorbachev, and Ikeda has included details of the Charter in many of his annual peace proposals since 1997. The SGI has supported the Earth Charter with production of global exhibitions including Seeds of Change in 2002 that traveled to 27 nations and Seeds of Hope in 2010, correlating with the Earth Charter-related documentary film, A Quiet Revolution, which the SGI has donated to schools and educational programs around the world.

Peace proposals
Since 26 January 1983, Ikeda has submitted annual peace proposals to the United Nations, addressing such areas as building a culture of peace, gender equality in education, empowerment of women, youth empowerment and activism for peace, UN reform and universal human rights with a view on global civilization. In presenting a Buddhist view, he draws parallels with peace and human rights struggles throughout history and discusses the civilizational influences of international relations, political science, philosophy, literature and social theory. A recurrent argument in these proposals is that "humans achieve their best potentials not in isolation, but as relating and interacting members of society."

Ikeda's proposals for nuclear disarmament and abolishing nuclear weapons submitted to the special session of the UN General Assembly in 1978, 1982 and 1988 built on his mentor Josei Toda's 1957 declaration condemning such weapons of mass destruction as "an absolute evil that threatens the people's right of existence." Calling for human security and sustainability in his 2012 peace proposal, he advocated for a transition away from nuclear-powered energy. In his 2015 peace proposal, he called on the international community for concerted multilateral action—"shared action"—for protecting human rights of displaced persons including refugees and migrants, ridding the world of nuclear weapons and constructing a global sustainable society. In his 2019 peace proposal, he advocated for multilateral support toward the entry into force of the Treaty on the Prohibition of Nuclear Weapons(TPNW), renewed efforts based on Article 6 of the Non-Proliferation Treaty to de-escalate tensions, and an international framework to ban lethal autonomous weapons (LAWs). In his 2020 peace proposal, "Towards Our Shared Future: Constructing an Era of Human Solidarity", Ikeda urges nations to collaborate to confront issues like natural disasters and climate change. In his 2021 peace proposal, Ikeda welcomed the entry into force of the TPNW and called for the "deterrent force" not of nuclear weapons but of "joint action and solidarity ... brought to bear against" the critical impacts of climate change and the COVID-19 pandemic. In his 2022 peace proposal, he addresses climate justice, inclusive education and nuclear disarmament, and calls for a shift away from nuclear-dependent security strategies.

In a public statement addressed to the 2022 NPT Review Conference, Ikeda issued an "emergency proposal" calling on the United States, Russia, the United Kingdom, France and China to shift from "existing deterrence policies" and "declare their commitment to the principle of No First Use at the earliest possible date." He cites the role of NFU policy pledges in averting an escalation in the China-India border clashes of June 2020.

Citizen diplomacy
Ikeda's work has been described by academics as citizen diplomacy for his contributions to diplomatic as well as intercultural ties between Japan and other countries, and more broadly between peoples of the world. Ikeda's dialogues with scholars, politicians, and cultural figures have increased awareness and support of humanitarian and peace activities, have facilitated deeper international relationships, and generated support for SGI-sponsored work on global issues including the environment and nuclear disarmament.

Academic researchers have suggested the body of literature chronicling Ikeda's diplomatic efforts and his more than 7,000 international dialogues provide readers with a personalized global education and model of citizen diplomacy and, from a scholarly view, represent "a new current in interculturalism and educational philosophy."

First in 1967 then several times in 1970, Ikeda met with Austrian-Japanese politician and philosopher Richard von Coudenhove-Kalergi, founder of the Paneuropean Movement. Their discussions which focused on east–west relations and the future of peace work were serialized in the 'Sankei Shimbun' newspaper in 1971. Between 1971 and 1974, Ikeda conducted multiple dialogues with Arnold J. Toynbee in London and Tokyo. The major topics of their meetings were published as the book Choose Life. In 1974, Ikeda conducted a dialogue with French novelist and Minister of Cultural Affairs Andre Malraux.

In September 1974, Ikeda visited the Soviet Union and met with Premier Alexei Kosygin. During their dialogue, Kosygin agreed with Ikeda, saying "We must abandon the very idea of war. It is meaningless. If we stop preparing for war and prepare instead for peace, we can produce food instead of armaments." He then asked Ikeda, "What is your basic ideology?" Ikeda replied, "I believe in peace, culture and education – the underlying basis of which is humanism." Kosygin said, "I have a high regard for those values. We need to realize them here in the Soviet Union as well."

In January 1975, Ikeda met with Henry Kissinger, then United States Secretary of State, to "urge the de-escalation of nuclear tensions between the United States and the Soviet Union." The same month Ikeda met with Secretary-General of the United Nations Kurt Waldheim. Ikeda presented Waldheim with a petition containing the signatures of 10,000,000 people calling for total nuclear abolition. The petition was organized by youth groups of the Soka Gakkai International and was inspired by Ikeda's longtime anti-nuclear efforts.

Ikeda's meetings with Nelson Mandela in the 1990s led to a series of SGI-sponsored anti-apartheid lectures, a traveling exhibit, and multiple student exchange programs at the university level. Their October 1990 meeting in Tokyo led to collaboration with the African National Congress and the United Nations Apartheid Center on an anti-apartheid exhibit inaugurated in Yokohama, Japan "on the 15th anniversary of the Soweto uprisings (16 June 1976)."

Dialogues between Ikeda and Gorbachev, published in 2005 as Moral Lessons of the Twentieth Century, have been described as "perhaps the best starting point from which to examine the search for a new historicity" of the twentieth century and inform the basis of a new humanism in the twenty-first century.
Ikeda's message to Ravenna on the occasion of celebrating the poet Dante Alighieri was described as an expression of spiritual resonance with the poet's life and world view, and as a contribution to intercultural dialogue that affirms the value of peaceful coexistence.

Sino-Japanese relations
Ikeda made several visits to China and met with Chinese Premier Zhou Enlai in 1974, though Sino-Japanese tensions remained over the brutalities of war waged by the Japanese militarists. The visits led to the establishment of cultural exchanges of art, dance and music between China and Japan and opened academic exchanges between Chinese educational institutions and Soka University. Chinese media describe Ikeda as an early proponent of normalizing diplomatic relations between China and Japan in the 1970s, citing his 1968 proposal that drew condemnation by some and the interest of others including Zhou Enlai. It was said that Zhou Enlai entrusted Ikeda with ensuring that "Sino-Japanese friendship would continue for generations to come."

Since 1975, cultural exchanges have continued between the Min-On Concert Association, founded by Ikeda, and institutions including the Chinese People's Association for Friendship with Foreign Countries. After Ikeda's 1984 visit to China and meetings with public figures including Chinese Communist Party Leader Hu Yaobang and Deng Yingchao, observers estimated that Ikeda's 1968 proposal moved Japanese public sentiment to support closer diplomatic ties with China and his cultivation of educational and cultural ties helped strengthen state relations.

Accolades

International awards
During a Turin Book Fair-hosted event concluding the 2018 five-day FIRMA-Faiths in Tune festival of religion, music and art, held in 2018 for the first time in Italy, an international jury presented a FIRMA award to Daisaku Ikeda "for his lifelong commitment to interreligious dialogue." Other international awards received by Ikeda include:
: Gold Medal for Human Rights from the Sydney Peace Foundation (2009)
: Gandhi International Prize for Social Responsibility (2014)
: Medalha D. André Arcoverde (D. André Arcoverde Medal) (2017)
: International Literary Award for Understanding and Friendship from the China Literature Foundation and Chinese Writersʼ Association (2003)
: Tagore Peace Award (1997) 
: Jamnalal Bajaj Award for Outstanding Contribution in Promotion of Gandhian Values Outside India by Individuals other than Indian Citizens (2005)
: Indology Award for Outstanding Contribution in the Field of Indic Research and Oriental Wisdom (2011)
: World Prize for Humanism (Macedonian: НА СВЕТСКАТА НАГРАДА ЗА ХУМАНИЗАМ) from the Ohrid Academy of Humanism (2007)
: Rizal International Peace Award (1998)
: Golden Heart Award from the Knights of Rizal (2012)
: Gusi Peace Prize
: Order of Friendship of the Russian Federation (2008)
: Wee Kim Wee Gold Award (2017)
: United Nations Peace Medal (1983)
: Rosa Parks Humanitarian Award (1993)
: International Tolerance Award from the Simon Wiesenthal Center (1993)
: Education as Transformation Award from the Education as Transformation Project, Wellesley College (2001)

International honors
In 1999, the Martin Luther King Jr. Chapel at Atlanta, Georgia-based Morehouse College established the Gandhi, King, Ikeda Institute for Ethics and Reconciliation as one of its programs to foster peace, nonviolence and reconciliation. In 2001, the Institute inaugurated the traveling exhibition Gandhi, King, Ikeda: A Legacy of Building Peace, to illustrate parallels in twentieth-century peace activism through the examples of Mahatma Gandhi, Martin Luther King Jr., and Daisaku Ikeda; and the Gandhi, King, Ikeda Community Builders Prize, to recognize individuals whose actions for peace transcend cultural, national and philosophical boundaries. In 2015, the Community Builders Prize went to Islamic scholar Fethullah Gülen.

In 2000, the city of Londrina, Brazil honored Ikeda by naming a 300-acre nature reserve in his name. The Dr. Daisaku Ikeda Ecological Park is open to the public and its land, waterways, fauna and wildlife are protected by Brazil's Federal Conservation Law.

In 2014, the City of Chicago named a section of Wabash Avenue in downtown Chicago "Daisaku Ikeda Way," with the Chicago City Council measure passing unanimously, 49 to 0.

The United States House of Representatives and individual states including Georgia, Missouri, and Illinois have passed resolutions honoring the service and dedication of Daisaku Ikeda as one "who has dedicated his entire life to building peace and promoting human rights through education and cultural exchange with deep conviction in the shared humanity of our entire global family." The state of Missouri praised Ikeda and his value of "education and culture as the prerequisites for the creation of true peace in which the dignity and fundamental rights of all people are respected."

The Club of Rome named Ikeda an honorary member, and, as of 2020, Ikeda has received more than 760 honorary citizenships from cities and municipalities around the world.

At the International Day for Poets of Peace in February 2016, an initiative launched by the Mohammed bin Rashid World Peace Award, Daisaku Ikeda from Japan along with Kholoud Al Mulla from the UAE, K. Satchidanandan from India and Farouq Gouda from Egypt were named International Poets of Peace. In presenting the honors, Shaikh Nahyan bin Mubarak Al Nahyan described the initiative as reinforcing "the idea that poetry, and literature in general, are a universal language that plays an important role in spreading the message of peace in the world," echoing the sentiments of Dr Hamad Al Shaikh Al Shaibani, chair of the World Peace Award's board of trustees, who cited the role of poets in "promoting a culture of hope and solidarity."

Academic honors
In November 2010, citing his peacebuilding efforts and promotion of cultural exchange and humanist education, the University of Massachusetts Boston bestowed an honorary doctorate upon Ikeda, marking the 300th such title conferred by higher learning institutions in more than 50 countries, which Ikeda accepted, he said, on behalf of SGI members and in recognition of their contributions to peace, culture and education. He received his first honorary doctorate in 1975 from Moscow State University and, as of August 2020, some 395 such academic honors.

Personal life
Ikeda lives in Tokyo with his wife, Kaneko Ikeda (née Kaneko Shiraki), whom he married on 3 May 1952. The couple had three sons, Hiromasa (vice president of Soka Gakkai), Shirohisa (died 1984), and Takahiro.

Books
Ikeda is a prolific writer, peace activist, and interpreter of Nichiren Buddhism. His interests in photography, art, philosophy, poetry and music are reflected in his published works. In his essay collections and dialogues with political, cultural, and educational figures he discusses, among other topics: the transformative value of religion, the universal sanctity of life, social responsibility, and sustainable progress and development.

The 1976 publication of Choose Life: A Dialogue (in Japanese, Nijusseiki e no taiga) is the published record of dialogues and correspondences that began in 1971 between Ikeda and British historian Arnold J. Toynbee about the "convergence of East and West" on contemporary as well as perennial topics ranging from the human condition to the role of religion and the future of human civilization. Toynbee's 12-volume A Study of History had been translated into Japanese, which along with his lecture tours and periodical articles about social, moral and religious issues gained him popularity in Japan. However, Toynbee being "paid well" for the interviews with Ikeda raised criticism, and questioning arose about an attempt to use Toynbee's reputation. To an expat's letter critical of Toynbee's association with Ikeda and Soka Gakkai, Toynbee wrote back: "I agree with Soka Gakkai on religion as the most important thing in human life, and on opposition to militarism and war." To another letter critical of Ikeda, Toynbee responded: "Mr. Ikeda's personality is strong and dynamic and such characters are often controversial. My own feeling for Mr. Ikeda is one of great respect and sympathy." As of 2012, the book had been translated and published in twenty-six languages.

In their 1984 book Before It Is Too Late, Ikeda and Aurelio Peccei discuss the human link in the ecological consequences of industrialization, calling for a reform in understanding human agency to effect harmonious relationships both between humans and with nature. They see a pivotal role in environmental education and a broadly curricular emphasis on developing global-scale thinking and a more humane society. On the basis of Ikeda's view of unity and Peccei's view of ecological interdependence, their dialogue attests to a convergence between European ecological, pacifist and humanitarian movements and Eastern religious thought.  The book is credited as summarizing Peccei's insights into the multifaceted challenges of post-WWII global society.

In Life—An Enigma, a Precious Jewel (1982), Unlocking the Mysteries of Birth and Death (1984) and the environmental education proposal "The Challenge of Global Empowerment" (2002), Ikeda's discussions of a Buddhist ontology offer an alternative to anthropocentric and biocentric approaches to wildlife conservation.

Ikeda's children's stories are "widely read and acclaimed," according to The Hindu, which reported that an anime series of 14 of the stories was to be shown on the National Geographic Channel. In the Philippines, DVD sets of 17 of the animated stories called Animazing Tales were donated by Anak TV to a large school, as part of a nationwide literacy effort. "Hope and perseverance in times of difficulty" describes the theme that runs through such stories as The Cherry Tree and The Snow Country Prince.

In 2003, Japan's largest English-language newspaper, The Japan Times, began carrying Ikeda's contributed commentaries on global issues including peacebuilding, nuclear disarmament, and compassion. By 2015, The Japan Times had published 26 of them, 15 of which the newspaper also published in a bilingual Japanese-English book titled Embracing the Future.

The sixteen conversations between Lou Marinoff and Ikeda in their book The Inner Philosopher (2012) introduce classic Eastern and Western philosophers in making the case that philosophy can be personally accessible and broadly applicable to daily life, and that "philosophy and psychology both can provide a source of robust optimism." A reviewer of the Italian edition, Qualunque fiore tu sia sboccerai, states that the two authors agree on a fundamental point: that the meaning and realization of oneself and one's existence are not found outside of oneself but, rather, as Marinoff points out, cultivated through dialogue, through a philosophy that becomes practical."

The Human Revolution
Ikeda's most well-known publication is the novel The Human Revolution (Ningen Kakumei), which was serialized in the Soka Gakkai's daily newspaper, the Seikyo Shimbun. Its book publication in English includes a foreword by British philosopher and historian Arnold J. Toynbee and has been translated into English, Chinese, French, German, Spanish, Portuguese, Korean and Dutch editions. In the preface to The Human Revolution, the author describes the book as a "novelized biography of my mentor, Josei Toda." The author's official website describes the book as an "historical novel [that] portrays the development of the Soka Gakkai in Japan, from its rebirth in the post-World War II era to the last years of its second president, Josei Toda." In the preface to the 2004 edition, the author stated the narrative was edited to bring it in line with recent developments in the history of Nichiren Buddhism, and that he hoped "such revisions will help readers to better appreciate the original message of the book."

Often described as a roman à clef, this autobiographical work "fosters an interpretation of Ikeda as being an exemplary disciple to his own mentor, Toda Josei," and offers "a model of the mentor-disciple relationship that is empowering" and portrays "the virtues of discipleship." This dramatic narrative helps readers "identify with him as someone not very different from themselves," presents "the mentor-disciple relationship as an attractive one that can enormously benefit the disciple," and "holds the promise for Gakkai members that they too can achieve greatness in the mentor-disciple relationship, which in turn helps them see the self-conception of disciple as one of strength." Chilson concludes that: "With the self-conception of a disciple, Gakkai members are more likely to strive to achieve goals articulated by their mentor, Ikeda, that transcend their own self interests, such as the expansion of the Gakkai's membership, and the promotion of culture, education, and world peace."

See also

List of peace activists

Selected works by Ikeda

A Dialogue Between East and West: Looking to a Human Revolution (Echoes and Reflections: The Selected Works of Daisaku Ikeda) with Ricardo Diez-Hochleitner, London and New York: I. B. Tauris, 2008;  (Hardback),  (Paperback)
A Lifelong Quest for Peace with Linus Pauling (May 2000), Jones and Bartlett Publishers, 1st edition,  (Hardback),  (Paperback); London and New York: I. B. Tauris, Reprint edition 2008; 
A Passage to Peace: Global Solutions from East and West with Nur Yalman, London and New York: I. B. Tauris, 2009;  (Hardback),  (Paperback)
A Quest for Global Peace: Rotblat and Ikeda on War, Ethics, and the Nuclear Threat with Joseph Rotblat, London and New York: I. B. Tauris, 2006; 
A Youthful Diary: One Man's Journey from the Beginning of Faith to Worldwide Leadership for Peace, Santa Monica, California: World Tribune Press, 2006; 
America Will Be!: Conversations on Hope, Freedom, and Democracy, with Vincent Harding, Cambridge, Massachusetts: Dialogue Path Press, 2013; 
Before It Is Too Late with Aurelio Peccei, (1984), Kodansha America, 1st edition, ; London and New York: I. B. Tauris Reprint edition, 2008; 
Buddhism: A Way of Values with Lokesh Chandra, New Delhi: Eternal Ganges Press, 2009; 
Buddhism: the First Millennium, (1977), Kodansha International,  (Hardback); Santa Monica, California: Middleway Press, Reprint edition, 2009; 
Choose Hope: Your Role in Waging Peace in the Nuclear Age with David Krieger, Santa Monica, California: Middleway Press, 2002;  
Choose Life: A Dialogue with Arnold J. Toynbee, Richard L. Gage (Editor), (1976), Oxford University Press, ; London and New York: I. B. Tauris, Reprint edition, 2008; 
Choose Peace: A Dialogue Between Johan Galtung and Daisaku Ikeda with Johan Galtung, London: Pluto Press, 1999; 
Compassionate Light in Asia with Jin Yong, London and New York: I. B. Tauris, 2013; 
Courage to Dream: On Rights, Values and Freedom with Vincent Harding, London and New York: I.B. Tauris, 2015; 
Creating Waldens: An East-West Conversation on the American Renaissance with Ronald A. Bosco and Joel Myerson, Cambridge, Massachusetts: Dialogue Path Press, 2009; 
Dawn After Dark with René Huyghe, (1991), Weatherhill, ; London and New York: I. B. Tauris, Reprint edition, 2008; 
Dialogue of World Citizens with Norman Cousins, (tentative translation from Japanese), Sekai shimin no taiwa, 世界市民の対話, Paperback edition, Tokyo, Japan: Seikyo Shimbunsha, 2000; 
Discussions on Youth, Santa Monica, California: World Tribune Press, 2010;  
Embracing the Future, Tokyo: The Japan Times, 2008; 
Fighting for Peace, Berkeley, California: Creative Arts Book Company, 2004; 
Fireflies Glow (children's book), translated by Kyoko Selden, illustrated by Subir Roy; New Delhi: Madhuban Educational Books, 2002; ; 
For the Sake of Peace: A Buddhist Perspective for the 21st Century, Santa Monica, California: Middleway Press, 2001; 
Glass Children and Other Essays, Tokyo: Kodansha International, 1979; 
Global Civilization: A Buddhist-Islamic Dialogue With Majid Tehranian, London and New York: I. B. Tauris, 2008; 
Human Rights in the 21st Century with Austregesilo de Athayde, London and New York: I. B. Tauris, 2009; 
Human Values in a Changing World: A Dialogue on the Social Role of Religion, with Bryan Wilson. Reprint edition. London and New York: I. B. Tauris, 2008; 
Humanity at the Crossroads: An Intercultural Dialogue with Karan Singh, New Delhi: Oxford University Press India, 1988; 
Into Full Flower: Making Peace Cultures Happen with Elise Boulding, Cambridge, Massachusetts: Dialogue Path Press, 2010; 
Journey of Life: Selected Poems of Daisaku Ikeda, London and New York: I. B. Tauris, 2014; 
Kanta and the Deer (children's book), New York: Weatherhill, 1997; 
'La fuerza de la Esperanza; Reflexiones sobre la paz y los derechos humanos en el tercer milenio' (dialogue between Argentine Nobel Peace laureate Dr. Adolfo Pérez Esquivel and Daisaku Ikeda), Buenos Aires: Emecé Editores, 2011; 
Life: An Enigma, a Precious Jewel, 1st edition, New York: Kodansha America, 1982; 
Moral Lessons of the Twentieth Century: Gorbachev and Ikeda on Buddhism and Communism with Mikhail Gorbachev, London and New York: I. B. Tauris, 2005; 
My Recollections, Santa Monica, California: World Tribune Press, 1980; 
New Horizons in Eastern Humanism Buddhism, Confucianism and the Quest for Global Peace with Tu Weiming, London and New York: I. B. Tauris, 2011; 
 Ode to the Grand Spirit: A dialogue Ode to the Grand Spirit: A Dialogue (Echoes and Reflections), with Chingiz Aitmatov, London and New York: I. B. Tauris, 2009; 
On Being Human: Where Ethics, Medicine, and Spirituality Converge with René Simard and Guy Bourgeault, Santa Monica, California: Middleway Press, 2003;  
On Peace, Life and Philosophy with Henry Kissinger (tentative translation from Japanese), Heiwa to jinsei to tetsugaku o kataru,「平和」と「人生」と「哲学」を語る, Tokyo, Japan: Ushio Shuppansha, 1987; 
One by One: The World is Yours to Change, Sonoma, California: Dunhill Publishing; Paper/DVD edition, 2004; 
Over the Deep Blue Sea (children's book), Brian Wildsmith (Illustrator), New York: Alfred A. Knopf, 1993, 
Planetary Citizenship: Your Values, Beliefs and Actions Can Shape A Sustainable World with Hazel Henderson, Santa Monica, California: Middleway Press, 2004; /
Rendezvous with nature: songs of peace / photographs by Daisaku Ikeda, Shizen to no taiwa: heiwa no shi, 自然との対話 平和の詩, Tokyo: Soka Gakkai, 2005; OCLC Number: 73228297
Revolutions to Green the Environment, to Grow the Human Heart: A Dialogue Between M.S. Swaminathan, Leader of the Ever-Green Revolution and Daisaku Ikeda, Proponent of the Human Revolution, Madras, India: East West Books, 2005; 
Search for a New Humanity: A Dialogue with Josef Derbolav, London and New York: I. B. Tauris, 2008;  
Soka Education: A Buddhist Vision for Teachers, Students and Parents, Santa Monica, California: Middleway Press, 2001;  
Songs from My Heart, (1978), Weatherhill, New York and Tokyo: Weatherhill, Reprint edition 1997; 
Space and Eternal Life with Chandra Wickramasinghe, Newburyport, Massachusetts: Journeyman Press, 1998; 
The Cherry Tree (children's book), Brian Wildsmith (Illustrator), New York: Knopf Books for Young Readers, 1992; 
The Flower of Chinese Buddhism, Santa Monica, California: Middleway Press, 2009; 
The Human Revolution (The Human Revolution, #1–12), abridged two-book set, Santa Monica, California: World Tribune Press, 2008; 
The Inner Philosopher: Conversations on Philosophy's Transformative Power with Lou Marinoff, Cambridge, Massachusetts: Dialogue Path Press, 2012; 
The Living Buddha: An Interpretive Biography, Santa Monica, California: Middleway Press, 2008; 
The New Human Revolution (an ongoing series) (30+ Volumes, this is an ongoing series), Santa Monica, California: World Tribune Press, 1995–; partial list of ISBN Vol.1 978-0-915678-33-4, Vol.2 978-0-915678-34-1, Vol.3 978-0-915678-35-8, Vol.4 978-0-915678-36-5, Vol.5 978-0-915678-37-2, Vol.6 978-0-915678-38-9, Vol.7 978-0-915678-39-6, Vol.8 978-0-915678-40-2, Vol.9 978-0-915678-41-9, Vol.10 978-0-915678-42-6, Vol.11 978-0-915678-43-3, Vol.12 978-0-915678-44-0, Vol.13 978-0-915678-45-7, Vol.14 978-0-915678-46-4, Vol.15 978-0-915678-47-1, Vol.16 978-0-915678-48-8, Vol.17 978-0-915678-49-5, Vol.18 978-0-915678-50-1, Vol.19 978-0-915678-51-8, Vol.20 978-0-915678-52-5, Vol.21 978-0-915678-53-2, Vol.22 978-0-915678-54-9, Vol.23 978-0-915678-55-6, Vol.24 978-0-915678-56-3
The Persistence of Religion: Comparative Perspectives on Modern Spirituality with Harvey Cox, London and New York: I. B. Tauris, 2009;  (Paperback),  (Hardback)
The Princess and the Moon (children's book), Brian Wildsmith (Illustrator), New York: Knopf Books for Young Readers, 1992; 
The Snow Country Prince (children's book), Brian Wildsmith (Illustrator), New York: Knopf Books for Young Readers, 1991; 
The Way of Youth: Buddhist Common Sense for Handling Life's Questions (with a foreword by Duncan Sheik), Santa Monica, California: Middleway Press, 2000, 
The Wisdom of the Lotus Sutra (6 volumes), Santa Monica, California: World Tribune Press, 2000 (vols 1 & 2), 2001 (vol 3), 2002 (vol 4), 2003 (vols 5 & 6);  (vol 1), 0-915678-70-5 (vol 2), 0-9-15678-71-3 (vol 3), 0-915678-72-1 (vol 4), 0-915678-73-X (vol 5), 0-915678-74-8 (vol 6)
Dialogue for a Greater Century of Humanism with John Kenneth Galbraith (in Japanese: 人間主義の大世紀を―わが人生を飾れ) Tokyo, Japan: Ushio Shuppansha, 2005; 
Unlocking the Mysteries of Birth and Death: A Buddhist View of Life, 2nd edition, Santa Monica, California: Middleway Press, 2004;

References

External links
 daisakuikeda.org – Official Daisaku Ikeda website
 sokaglobal.org – Official SGI profile of Daisaku Ikeda
 YouTube – Official YouTube channel of Daisaku Ikeda's animated stories for children, in several languages

Related websites
 ikedacenter.org – The Ikeda Center for Peace, Learning, and Dialogue
 soka.ac.jp/en – Full text of selected lectures by Soka University Founder

1928 births
20th-century Buddhists
20th-century essayists
20th-century Japanese historians
20th-century Japanese male writers
20th-century Japanese novelists
20th-century Japanese philosophers
20th-century Japanese poets
21st-century Buddhists
21st-century essayists
21st-century Japanese historians
21st-century Japanese novelists
21st-century Japanese poets
21st-century Japanese philosophers
Buddhist pacifists
Scholars of Buddhism
Buddhist writers
Environmental philosophers
Environmental writers
Foreign Members of the Russian Academy of Education
Japanese anti–nuclear weapons activists
Japanese art historians
Japanese Buddhists
Japanese children's writers
Japanese essayists
Japanese ethicists
Japanese historical novelists
Japanese male poets
Japanese nature writers
Japanese pacifists
Japanese philosophers
Japanese religious leaders
Living people
Members of Sōka Gakkai
Nonviolence advocates
Philosophers of art
Philosophers of culture
Philosophers of economics
Philosophers of education
Philosophers of literature
Philosophers of love
Philosophers of mind
Philosophers of religion
Philosophers of social science
Philosophers of war
Philosophy writers
Political philosophers
Recipients of the Order of Cultural Merit (Korea)
Recipients of the Order of the Sun of Peru
Social commentators
Social philosophers
Soka Gakkai
Theorists on Western civilization
University and college founders
Writers about activism and social change
Writers about globalization
Writers about religion and science
Writers from Tokyo
Writers of historical fiction set in the early modern period
Writers of historical fiction set in the modern age
Nansen Refugee Award laureates